The Bounty Man is a 1972 American made-for-television Western film directed by John Llewellyn Moxey and starring Clint Walker, Richard Basehart, John Ericson and Margot Kidder.

Plot
A bounty hunter and his old rival both chase after a killer.

Cast
 Clint Walker as Kincaid
 Richard Basehart as Angus Keough
 John Ericson as Billy Riddle
 Margot Kidder as Mae
 Gene Evans as Tom Brady
 Arthur Hunnicutt as Sheriff
 Rex Holman as Driskill
 Wayne Sutherlin as Tully 
 Paul Harper as Hargus
 Dennis Cross as Rufus
 Vince St. Cyr as Santana 
 Glenn R. Wilder as Gault
 Hal Needham as Pike
 Rita Conde as Hargus' Woman
 Robert Swan as 1st Bartender
 Duke Cigrang as 2nd Bartender

See also
 List of American films of 1972

References

External links

The Bounty Man at BFI

1972 films
Films directed by John Llewellyn Moxey